Wieprz Landscape Park (Nadwieprzański Park Krajobrazowy) is a protected area (Landscape Park) in eastern Poland, established in 1990, covering an area of .

The Park lies within Lublin Voivodeship, on a stretch of the Wieprz river near the town of Łęczna.

Wieprz
Parks in Lublin Voivodeship
1990 establishments in Poland